Machine Learning  is a peer-reviewed scientific journal, published since 1986.

In 2001, forty editors and members of the editorial board of Machine Learning resigned in order to support the Journal of Machine Learning Research (JMLR), saying that in the era of the internet, it was detrimental for researchers to continue publishing their papers in expensive journals with pay-access archives. Instead, they wrote, they supported the model of JMLR, in which authors retained copyright over their papers and archives were freely available on the internet.

Following the mass resignation, Kluwer changed their publishing policy to allow authors to self-archive their papers online after peer-review.

Selected articles

References 

Computer science journals
Machine learning
Delayed open access journals
Springer Science+Business Media academic journals
Publications established in 1986